Manuel Vicente Maza (1779 – June 27, 1839) was an Argentine lawyer and federal politician. He was governor of Buenos Aires, and was killed after the discovery of a failed plot to kill Juan Manuel de Rosas.

Biography
Even though Maza was born in Buenos Aires, he finished his university studies in Law at the Royal University of San Felipe, in Santiago, Chile.

As the independence movement from Spain grew in South America, Maza was taken prisoner in Lima, by that time the centre of the Viceroyalty of Peru, and later spent time in reclusion in Buenos Aires, released in 1815. That year he started his political activity as head of the Civil Commission of Justice of Buenos Aires, bringing about the justice administration regulation named after him. In 1816 he served as mayor at the Buenos Aires Cabildo.
In the following years he developed a friendship and political relationship with Juan Manuel de Rosas.

During the 1820s Maza became widely involved in political activity. He was sent to exile for the first time in 1823 because of his participation in the uprising against Martín Rodríguez, and then again in 1829 to Bahía Blanca for rising up against Juan Lavalle.

When Rosas returned to power, Maza assumed an important role in Rosas' government. At the meeting with José María Paz in Córdoba, Maza accompanied Rosas, when they suffered an assassination attempt.

With Rosas gone in 1832, Maza was named Chief Minister by Juan Ramón Balcarce, but a year later he took part in the movement that demanded Balcarce's resignation. He also took part in the following brief administration of Juan José Viamonte.

In 1834, and after several potential candidates refused to take the government of the Buenos Aires Province, Maza, as president of the legislature, was designated interim governor. In February 1835 he sent Facundo Quiroga as mediator in the conflict between the governors of the provinces of Salta and Tucumán. As Quiroga was assassinated on his way back to Buenos Aires, Maza was forced to resign on March 7; Rosas once again became governor on April 13.

Maza went back to the legislature in spite of the growing confrontations with Rosas that started during Maza's term in the government. He was also designated as judge in the trial to the Reinafé brothers, accused of Quiroga's assassination.

In June 1839 Maza's son, coronel Ramón Maza, was taken prisoner, suspected of a conspiracy against Rosas.

During the French blockade of the Río de la Plata Juan Lavalle organized an army in Uruguay, attempting to attack Buenos Aires. His plans were supported by conspiracies in Buenos Aires by former member of the May Association. The most notable member of the conspiration was Ramón Maza, son of the former governor Manuel Vicente Maza, who got military support. As Lavalle was delaying, they developed a new plan: Pedro Castelli and Nicolás Granada would make a revolt at Tapalqué, while the military in the city killed Rosas, Manuel Maza assumed government and allowed Lavalle to take the city. The plot was discovered by the Mazorca, but Rosas thought that Manuel Maza was innocent and carried to the plots of his son, so he urged him to leave the country. He could not: Martínez Fontes, one of the military talked into the complot, revealed it in public. Popular commotion was high, and the people took the streets demanding the execution of the people involved with the complot. Ramón Maza was executed, and his parent was killed in his office by the Mazorca. Nevertheless, Pedro Castelli attempted to make a rebellion in the countryside. The people did not follow him, and he was executed as well.

Bibliography

References

Federales (Argentina)
Lawyers from Buenos Aires
19th-century Argentine lawyers
Governors of Buenos Aires Province
Assassinated Argentine politicians
Deaths by stabbing in Argentina
1779 births
1839 deaths